Pabellón de Arteaga is a city in the Mexican state of Aguascalientes. The city serves as the municipal seat of the municipality of Pabellón de Arteaga. As of 2010, the city had a total population of 28,633, up from 26,797 in 2005. It is the third-largest city in the state behind Aguascalientes and Jesús María.

Its principal public party is on November 20 in a party called Feria de La Revolucion who commemorates the national uprising against Porfirio Díaz in 1910. Most of the people  in this town study and work in the city of Aguascalientes. It is a half hour drive from Pabellon de Arteaga to Aguascalientes. Also every half hour a public transportation service called Las Combis go to Aguascalientes.

Pabellon has three high schools, two junior high schools, and several elementary schools.
On Mondays a traveling marketplace called "El Tianguis" set shop on the streets of Pabellon.

Climate

References

Link to tables of population data from Census of 2005 Instituto Nacional de Estadística, Geografía e Informática (INEGI)
Aguascalientes Enciclopedia de los Municipios de México

External links
Ayuntamiento de Pabellón de Arteaga Official website

Populated places in Aguascalientes